The Pennsylvania Governor's Residence is the official residence of the governor of Pennsylvania, in the Uptown neighborhood of Harrisburg, Pennsylvania. The neo-Georgian residence was built from 1966 to 1968 and designed by George M. Ewing, heading an architectural firm in Philadelphia. The mansion was previously only used for official functions and meetings, because then-Governor Tom Wolf commuted from his private residence in nearby Mount Wolf.

Incumbent Governor Josh Shapiro and his family currently reside in the Governor's Residence. 

The seven-bay brick front has a wide projecting pedimented central bay, in which a Palladian window perches on a pedimented doorway. The mansion is home to two Steinway grand pianos used for concerts and to entertain dinner guests. Every holiday season the house is opened for special tours.

The mansion is located adjacent to the Susquehanna River and flooding has proven to be a significant hazard. Water intrusion in the basement area is a frequent issue and the mansion has been evacuated three times since its construction due to serious inundation.  The first and most serious time was during Hurricane Agnes in 1972; then-Governor Milton Shapp and his wife Muriel evacuated for the weekend and returned by boat to inspect the flooded damage in a common photograph at the time. The most recent was 2011 during Tropical Storm Lee.  

In 2021, following years of planning, a $1.9 million renovation began on the courtyard to restore more greenspace, amenities, and accessibility.

References

External links 
 Governor's Residence website 
 The Governors Residence

Houses completed in 1968
Governors' mansions in the United States
Residence
Buildings and structures in Harrisburg, Pennsylvania
Landmarks in Harrisburg, Pennsylvania
Government buildings in Pennsylvania
Houses in Dauphin County, Pennsylvania
Historic house museums in Pennsylvania
Museums in Harrisburg, Pennsylvania